The 1929 Lehigh Brown and White football team was an American football team that represented Lehigh University during the 1929 college football season. In its second season under head coach A. Austin Tate, the team compiled a 4–3–2 record.  

The team played its home games at Taylor Stadium in Bethlehem, Pennsylvania.

Schedule

References

Lehigh
Lehigh Mountain Hawks football seasons
Lehigh football